One Week at a Time can refer to one of the following television shows:
One Week at a Time (AFL), a sports analysis show  centred on Australian rules football first screened in 2009 till 2011
One Week at a Time (NRL), a sports analysis show  centred on rugby league football first screened in 2011